The Great Britain women's national rugby union team was the national rugby union team of Great Britain, from 1986 to 1990. The team was organised by the Women's Rugby Football Union (which was responsible for women's rugby in the UK from 1983 to 1994) and was gradually replaced by separate teams representing England, Scotland and Wales between 1987 and 1990.

History

Results summary
(Full internationals only)

Results

Full internationals

See also
Stefan Czerpak

Rugby Union Women
European national women's rugby union teams
Rugby union in the United Kingdom
Multinational rugby union teams